The American bushtit or simply bushtit (Psaltriparus minimus) is the only species placed in the genus Psaltriparus and the only species in the family Aegithalidae that is found in the New World.

Taxonomy
The American bushtit was formally described by the American naturalist John Kirk Townsend in 1837 and given the binomial name Parus minimus. Townsend noted that the species inhabited the forests of the Columbia River. It is now the only species placed in the genus Psaltriparus that was introduced in 1850 by the French naturalist Charles Lucien Bonaparte. The genus name Psaltriparus combines the genus Psaltria that was introduced by Coenraad Temminck in 1836 for the pygmy bushtit with Parus that was introduced by Carl Linnaeus in 1758 for the tits.

Ten subspecies are recognised:
 P. m. saturatus Ridgway, 1903 – southwest Canada and northwest USA
 P. m. minimus (Townsend, JK, 1837) – coastal west USA
 P. m. melanurus Grinnell & Swarth, 1926 – southwest USA and north Baja California
 P. m. grindae Ridgway, 1883 – south Baja California
 P. m. californicus Ridgway, 1884 – south-central Oregon to south-central California
 P. m. plumbeus (Baird, SF, 1854) – west-central, south USA and northcentral Mexico
 P. m. dimorphicus Van Rossem & Hachisuka, 1938 – south-central USA and north-central Mexico
 P. m. iulus Jouy, 1894 – west, central Mexico
 P. m. personatus Bonaparte, 1850 – south-central Mexico
 P. m. melanotis (Hartlaub, 1844) – south Mexico and Guatemala

The subspecies P. m. melanotis was formerly considered a separate species, the "black-eared bushtit".

Description and behavior

The American bushtit inhabits mixed open woodlands, often containing oaks and a scrubby chaparral understory; it also inhabits parks and gardens. It is a year-round resident of the western United States and highland parts of Mexico, ranging from Vancouver through the Great Basin and the lowlands and foothills of California to southern Mexico and Guatemala.

It is gray-brown overall, with a large head, a short neck, a long tail, and a short stubby bill. Bushtits are sexually dimorphic. The male has dark brown to black eyes and the adult female yellow eyes. Coastal forms have a brown "cap" while those in the interior have a brown "mask."

The subspecies (P. m. melanotis) can be identified by its dark ear patch (the auricular). This polymorphism does not occur in the northern part of the American bushtits' range, but is first noted near the Mexican border, primarily in Texas. Most individuals with the black ear patch in that area are juvenile males, and none are adult females – some have only one or two dark lines on the face instead of a complete patch. The black-eared form becomes more common southward in the northeastern (but not the northwestern) highlands of Mexico until from central Mexico south, all males have a complete black ear patch and even adult females have a black arc over the eye and usually a black line through the eye.

The American bushtit is active and gregarious, foraging for small insects and spiders in mixed-species feeding flocks containing species such as chickadees and warblers, of 10 to over 40 individuals. Members of the group constantly make contact calls to each other that can be described as a short spit.

This species produces an elaborate pendant nest of moss and lichen assembled with spider silk and lined with feathers.

Gallery

References

Further reading

 
 
 
 Sloane, S.A. (2001). Bushtit. In Birds of North America, A. Poole, P. Stettenheim, F. Gill, Eds. Philadelphia: American Ornithologists Union.

External links

 Bushtit species account – Cornell Lab of Ornithology
 
 
 

American bushtit
Native birds of the Western United States
Fauna of the California chaparral and woodlands
Birds of the Great Basin
Birds of Mexico
Birds of Guatemala
American bushtit
American bushtit
Birds of the Sierra Madre Occidental
Birds of the Sierra Madre Oriental
Birds of the Sierra Madre del Sur
Birds of the Trans-Mexican Volcanic Belt